Sophia Ananiadou is a British computer scientist and computational linguist. She led the development of and directs the National Centre for Text Mining (NaCTeM) in the United Kingdom. She is also a Professor in the Department of Computer Science at the University of Manchester.

Her research focusses on biomedical text mining and natural language processing and has fed into the development of numerous applications that, for example, facilitate the discovery of new knowledge, enable exploration of historical archives, allow semantic search of biomedical literature, reduce human effort in screening search hits for production of systematic reviews, enable enrichment of metabolic pathway models with evidence from the literature, allow discovery of risk in the construction industry from health and safety incident reports and enable interoperability of components in text mining workflows.

Education
Ananiadou was educated at the Lycée français St Joseph in Athens, Greece (1969–1975). She received a Bachelor of Arts (Ptychion) from the University of Athens (1979), a Master of Advanced Studies (DEA) in Linguistics from Paris VII, Jussieu, France (1980), a DEA in Literature from Paris IV, Sorbonne, France (1984) and a PhD in Computational linguistics from the University of Manchester Institute of Science and Technology (UMIST), in 1988.

Career and research
Ananiadou was a research assistant at Dalle Molle Institute for Semantic and Cognitive Studies (ISSCO, 1983–1984), a Research Assistant (1985–1988) then Research Associate (1988–1993) in the Department of Language Engineering at UMIST, Senior Lecturer at Manchester Metropolitan University (1993–1999), Senior Lecturer then Reader in the School of Computing Science and Engineering, University of Salford (2000–2005), then Reader in the School of Computer Science, University of Manchester (2005–2009). Since 2009, she has served as Professor in Computer Science in the Department of Computer Science at the University of Manchester.

Ananiadou has published since 1986, has an h-index of 64 and a Research.com United Kingdom ranking in Computer Science of 99. Since 2018, she has served as the deputy director of the Institute for Data Science and Artificial Intelligence, University of Manchester. Ananiadou received a Diplôme de traducteur (Diploma of Translator) from the Institut français d'Athènes, Greece (1979) and a Certificate in Counselling from the University of Salford, UK 2004.

Awards and honours 
In 2019, in recognition of her contributions in Artificial Intelligence and text mining for Biomedicine, Ananiadou received an honorary doctorate from the University of the Aegean, on the 20th anniversary of its Department of Mediterranean Studies, Rhodes.

Ananiadou received the Unstructured Information Management Architecture (UIMA) innovation award from IBM three years running (2006, 2007 & 2008). She was awarded the Daiwa Adrian Prize in 2004 and also received a Japan Trust award from the Ministry of Education, Japan in 1997.

Ananiadou has been a Fellow of the Alan Turing Institute in London since 2018.

Since 2021, she is a member of the ELLIS Society, the professional society of the cross-national European Laboratory for Learning and Intelligent Systems.

Ananiadou served as vice president (VP) of the European Association for Terminology from 1997 to 1999.

At the 28th International Conference on Computational Linguistics (COLING 2020), she received, with M. Li and H. Takamura, an Outstanding Paper designation for the paper "A Neural Model for Aggregating Coreference Annotation in Crowdsourcing".

References 

Living people
British women computer scientists
Academics of the University of Manchester
British computer scientists
1957 births
Greek computer scientists
Computer scientists
Natural language processing researchers